Ali Benjamin Nadjem (Dari: علی بنیامین نجم; born 2 April 1995) is a footballer who plays as a right-back. Born in Afghanistan and raised in Germany, he has represented the Afghanistan national team at international level.

Youth career
Nadjem began his youth career with SC Concordia. Nadjem played also in the youth of FC St. Pauli before making his debut for the second team of St. Pauli.

Club career

FC St. Pauli II
Nadjem played three games in the 2013–14 season with FC St. Pauli II. In his second season he became a regular starter for the team and played 24 games and received 3 yellow cards. In his 3rd season he played 25 games and received six yellow cards. In the 2016–17 season he made his first assist.

Meiendorfer SV
On 9 January 2020, it was confirmed, that Nadjem had joined Meiendorfer SV in the Oberliga Hamburg.

International career
Nadjem was called up in January for the Afghanistan national team. He made his debut for Afghanistan in a 2–1 friendly win over Singapore on 23 March 2017.

References

External links
 
 
 

1995 births
Living people
German people of Afghan descent
Afghan emigrants to Germany
Afghan footballers
German footballers
Footballers from Kabul
Association football defenders
Afghanistan international footballers
Regionalliga players
FC St. Pauli players
FC St. Pauli II players
SV Drochtersen/Assel players